Moriturus may refer to:
 Moriturus (film), a 1920 German silent crime film

See also
 Morituris, a 2011 Italian horror film directed by Raffaele Picchio
 "Nemo moriturus praesumitur mentiri" ("no one on the point of death should be presumed to be lying"), a medieval legal principle for a dying declaration
 Morituri (disambiguation)